Xylosma flexuosa, commonly known as brushholly or coronilla, is a species of flowering plant in the family Salicaceae, that is native to southern North America and northern South America. Its range stretches from southern Texas in the United States south through Mexico and Central America to Venezuela. It can also be found on the island of Curaçao in the Netherlands Antilles. Brush holly is a spiny evergreen shrub, usually reaching a height of  but able to attain  in height. It is sometimes cultivated as an ornamental hedge.

References

External links

flexuosa
Plants described in 1879
Flora of Central America
Flora of Curaçao
Flora of Mexico
Flora of Texas
Flora of Venezuela